Tallahassee is the capital city of the U.S. state of Florida. It is the county seat and only incorporated municipality in Leon County. Tallahassee became the capital of Florida, then the Florida Territory, in 1824. In 2020, the population was 196,169, making it the eighth-largest city in the state of Florida. The population of the Tallahassee metropolitan area was 385,145 . Tallahassee is the largest city in the Florida Big Bend and Florida Panhandle region, and the main center for trade and agriculture in the Florida Big Bend and Southwest Georgia regions.

With a student population exceeding 70,000, Tallahassee is a college town, home to Florida State University, ranked the nation's 19th-best public university by U.S. News & World Report; Florida A&M University, ranked the nation's best public historically black university by U.S. News & World Report; and Tallahassee Community College, a large state college that serves mainly as a feeder school to Florida State and Florida A&M.

As the capital, Tallahassee is the site of the Florida State Capitol, Supreme Court of Florida, Florida Governor's Mansion, and nearly 30 state agency headquarters. The city is also known for its large number of law firms, lobbying organizations, trade associations and professional associations, including the Florida Bar and the Florida Chamber of Commerce. It is a recognized regional center for scientific research, and home to the National High Magnetic Field Laboratory. In 2015, Tallahassee was awarded the All-American City Award by the National Civic League for the second time.

History

Indigenous peoples occupied this area for thousands of years before European encounter. Around 1200 CE, the large and complex Mississippian culture had built earthwork mounds near Lake Jackson which survive today; they are preserved in the Lake Jackson Archaeological State Park.

The Spanish Empire established their first colonial settlement at St. Augustine. During the 17th century they established several missions in Apalachee territory to procure food and labor to support their settlement, as well as to convert the natives to Roman Catholicism. The largest, Mission San Luis de Apalachee in Tallahassee, has been partially reconstructed by the state of Florida.

The expedition of Pánfilo de Narváez encountered the Apalachee people, although it did not reach the site of Tallahassee. Hernando de Soto and his mid-16th century expedition occupied the Apalachee town of Anhaica (at what is now Tallahassee) in the winter of 1538–39. The De Soto encampment is believed to be the first place Christmas was celebrated in the continental United States, although there is no historical documentation to back this claim.

The name Tallahassee is a Muskogean language word often translated as "old fields" or "old town". It was likely an expression of the Creek people who migrated from Georgia and Alabama to this region in the late 18th and early 19th centuries, under pressure from European-American encroachment on their territory. They found large areas of cleared land previously occupied by the Apalachee tribe. (The Creek and later refugees who joined them developed as the Seminole Indians of Florida. The Talimali Band of Apalachee Indians in Louisiana identify as present-day descendants of the Apalachee Indians.)

During the First Seminole War, General Andrew Jackson fought two separate skirmishes in and around Tallahassee, which was then Spanish territory. The first battle took place on November 12, 1817. After Chief Neamathla, of the village of Fowltown just west of present-day Tallahassee, refused Jackson's orders to relocate, Jackson entered the village, burnt it to the ground, and drove off its occupants. The Indians retaliated, killing 50 soldiers and civilians. Jackson reentered Florida in March 1818. According to Jackson's adjutant, Colonel Robert Butler, they "advanced on the Indian village called Tallahasse (sic) [where] two of the enemy were made prisoner."

State capital

Florida became an American territory in September 1821, in accordance with the Adams-Onís Treaty of 1819.

The first session of the Legislative Council of the Territory of Florida met on July 22, 1822, at Pensacola, the former capital of West Florida. Members from St. Augustine, the former capital of East Florida, traveled 59 days by water to attend. The second session was in St. Augustine, and western delegates needed 28 days to travel perilously around the peninsula to reach St. Augustine. During this session, delegates decided to hold future meetings at a halfway point. Two appointed commissioners selected Tallahassee, at that point an Apalachee settlement (Anhaica) virtually abandoned after Andrew Jackson burned it in 1818, as a halfway point. In 1824 the third legislative session met there in a crude log building serving as the capitol.

From 1821 through 1845, during Florida's territorial period, the rough-hewn frontier capital gradually developed as a town. The Marquis de Lafayette, French hero of the American Revolution, returned to the United States in 1824 for a tour. The U.S. Congress voted to give him $200,000 (the same amount he had given the colonies in 1778), US citizenship, and the Lafayette Land Grant,  of land that today includes large portions of Tallahassee. In 1845 a Greek revival masonry structure was erected as the Capitol building in time for statehood. Now known as the "old Capitol", it stands in front of the high-rise Capitol building built in the 1970s.

Tallahassee was in the heart of Florida's Cotton Belt—Leon County led the state in cotton production—and was the center of the slave trade in Florida. During the American Civil War, Tallahassee was the only Confederate state capital east of the Mississippi River not captured by Union forces, and the only one not burned. A small engagement, the Battle of Natural Bridge, was fought south of the city on March 6, 1865, just a month before the war ended.

During the 19th century, the institutions that would develop into what is now Florida State University were established in Tallahassee; it became a university town. These included the Tallahassee Female Academy (founded 1843) and the Florida Institute (founded 1854). In 1851, the Florida legislature decreed two seminaries to be built on either side of the Suwannee River, East Florida Seminary and West Florida Seminary. In 1855 West Florida Seminary was transferred to the Florida Institute building (which had been established as an inducement for the state to place the seminary in Tallahassee). In 1858, the seminary absorbed the Tallahassee Female Academy and became coeducational. Its main building was near the northwest corner of South Copeland and West Jefferson streets, approximately where FSU's Westcott Building is today.

In 1887, the Normal College for Colored Students, the ancestor of today's FAMU, opened its doors. The legislature decided Tallahassee was the best location in Florida for a college serving African-American students; the state had segregated schools. Four years later its name was changed to State Normal and Industrial College for Colored Students, to teach teachers for elementary school children and students in industrial skills.

After the Civil War much of Florida's industry moved to the south and east, a trend that continues today. The end of slavery and the rise of free labor reduced the profitability of the cotton and tobacco trade, at a time when world markets were also changing. The state's major industries shifted to citrus, lumber, naval stores, cattle ranching, and tourism. The latter was increasingly important by the late 19th century. In the post-Civil War period, many former plantations in the Tallahassee area were purchased by wealthy northerners for use as winter hunting preserves. This included the hunting preserve of Henry L. Beadel, who bequeathed his land for the study of the effects of fire on wildlife habitat. Today the preserve is known as the Tall Timbers Research Station and Land Conservancy, nationally recognized for its research into fire ecology and the use of prescribed burning.

1900–99
Until World War II, Tallahassee remained a small Southern town  The main economic drivers were the colleges and state government, where politicians met to discuss spending money on grand public improvement projects to accommodate growth in places such as Miami and Tampa Bay, hundreds of miles away from the capital.

Tallahassee was also active in protest during the civil rights era. The Tallahassee bus boycott was a citywide boycott in Tallahassee, Florida that sought to end racial segregation in the employment and seating arrangements of city buses. On May 26, 1956, Wilhelmina Jakes and Carrie Patterson, two Florida A&M University students, were arrested by the Tallahassee Police Department for "placing themselves in a position to incite a riot". Robert Saunders, representing the NAACP, and Rev. C. K. Steele began talks with city authorities while the local African-American community started boycotting the city's buses. The Inter-Civic Council ended the boycott on December 22, 1956. On January 7, 1957, the City Commission repealed the bus-franchise segregation clause because of the United States Supreme Court ruling Browder v. Gayle (1956). In the 1960s there was a movement to transfer the capital to Orlando, closer to the state's growing population centers. That movement was defeated; the 1970s saw a long-term commitment by the state to the capital city, with the construction of the new capitol complex and preservation of the old Florida State Capitol building.

In 1970, the Census Bureau reported the city's population as 74.0% white and 25.4% black. In 1971, the city elected James R. Ford to the 5-member City Commission, and he became the city's first African-American mayor in 1972 (commissioners rotated into the position serving a one-year term).
 
Bobby Bowden became the head coach of Florida State Seminoles football in 1976, and turned Tallahassee into a city dominated by college football, Bowden became very successful very quickly at Florida State. By his second year, Bowden had to deny many rumors that he would leave for another job; the team went 9–2, compared to the four wins total in the three seasons before Bowden. During 34 years as head coach he had only one losing season–his first, in 1976.

In 1977 the 22-story high-rise Capitol building, designed by architect Edward Durell Stone, was completed. It is now (2021) the third-tallest state capitol building in the United States. In 1978 the Old Capitol, directly in front of the new capitol, was scheduled for demolition, but state officials decided to keep the Old Capitol as a museum. In 1986, Jack McLean served as mayor, the second African-American to hold the position.

2000–present
Tallahassee was the center of world attention for six weeks during the 2000 United States Presidential election recount, which involved numerous rulings by the Florida Secretary of State and the Florida Supreme Court.

In 2016, the city suffered a direct hit by Hurricane Hermine, causing about 80% of the city proper to lose power, including Florida State University, and knocking down many trees.

In 2018, the city suffered another natural disaster when Hurricane Michael hit the panhandle.

Geography

Tallahassee's terrain is hilly by Florida standards, being at the southern end of the Red Hills Region, just above the Cody Scarp. The city includes two large lake basins, Lake Jackson and Lake Lafayette, and borders the northern end of the Apalachicola National Forest.

The flora and fauna are similar to those found in the mid-south and low country regions of South Carolina and Georgia. The palm trees are the more cold-hardy varieties like the state tree, the Sabal palmetto. Pines, magnolias, hickories, and a variety of oaks are the dominant trees. The Southern Live Oak is perhaps the most emblematic of the city.

Nearby cities and suburbs

Crawfordville
Havana
Lamont
Lloyd
Midway
Monticello
Quincy

Cityscape

Neighborhoods
Tallahassee has many neighborhoods inside the city limits. Some of the most known and defined include All Saints, Apalachee Ridge, Betton Hills, Buck Lake, Callen, Frenchtown (the oldest historically black neighborhood in the state), Killearn Estates, Killearn Lakes Plantation, Lafayette Park, Levy Park, Los Robles, Midtown, Holly Hills, Jake Gaither/University Park, Indian Head Acres, Myers Park, Smokey Hollow, SouthWood, Seminole Manor and Woodland Drives.

Tallahassee is also home to some gated communities, including Golden Eagle, Ox Bottom, Lafayette Oaks and The Preserve at San Luis; the Tallahassee Ranch Club is to the southeast of the city.

Tallest buildings

Urban planning and expansion

The first plan for the Capitol Center was the 1947 Taylor Plan, which consolidated several government buildings in one downtown area. In 1974, the Capitol Center Planning Commission for the City of Tallahassee, Florida responded to growth of its urban center with a conceptual plan for the expansion of its Capitol Center. Hisham Ashkouri, working for The Architects' Collaborative, led the urban planning and design effort. Estimating growth and related development for approximately the next 25 years, the program projected the need for 2.3 million square feet (214,000 m2) of new government facilities in the city core, with 3,500 dwelling units,  of new public open space, retail and private office space, and other ancillary spaces. Community participation was an integral part of the design review, welcoming Tallahassee residents to provide input as well as citizens' groups and government agencies, resulting in the creation of six separate design alternatives.

Sprawl and compact growth
The Tallahassee-Leon County Planning Department implements policies aimed at promoting compact growth and development, including the establishment and maintenance of an Urban Service Area. The intent of the Urban Service Area is to "have Tallahassee and Leon County grow in a responsible manner, with infrastructure provided economically and efficiently, and surrounding forest and agricultural lands protected from unwarranted and premature conversion to urban land use." The result of compact growth policies has been a significant overall reduction in the Sprawl Index for Tallahassee between 2000 and 2010. CityLab reported on this finding, stating "Tallahassee laps the field, at least as far as the Sprawl Index is concerned."

Climate

Tallahassee has a humid subtropical climate (Köppen Cfa), with long, tropical summers and short, mild winters, as well as warm to hot, drier springs and autumns. Tallahassee falls in USDA hardiness zones 8b (15 °F to 20 °F) Summer maxima here are hotter than in the Florida peninsula and it is one of the few cities in the state to occasionally record temperatures above ; there are an average of 11.2 days per year that have temperatures at least that high.

Summer is characterized by brief intense showers and thunderstorms that form along the afternoon sea breeze from the Gulf of Mexico. There is an average of 34.6 nights with a minimum at or below freezing, and on average, the window for freezing temperatures is from November 22 thru March 16, allowing a growing season of 250 days. Temperature readings below  are very rare, having last occurred on January 11, 2010.

During the Great Blizzard of 1899 the city reached  on February 13, which remains Florida's only recorded subzero reading. At the time, Tallahassee's record low was colder than the record low in Tromsø, Norway. More recently, a  daily maximum was recorded in 1985.
However, the city itself is considerably warmer than the airport where the National Weather Service records its data from, even though the National Weather Service does not record data from it. This is due to an urban heat island, which creates an average disparity of 5.8 °F (3.2 °C) and is especially pronounced during winter.

Snow and ice are rare in Tallahassee, not occurring during most winters.

Although several hurricanes have brushed Tallahassee with their outer rain and wind bands, in recent years only Hurricane Kate, in 1985, and Hurricane Hermine, in 2016, have struck Tallahassee directly. Hurricane Michael passed 50 miles to the west after making landfall near Mexico Beach, Florida in October 2018 as a Category 5 storm, resulting in 95% of Leon County being without power.

The Big Bend area of North Florida sees several tornadoes each year during the season, but they are generally weak, cause little structural damage, and rarely hit the city. On April 19, 2015, a tornado touched down in Tallahassee. Damage included numerous downed tree limbs and a car crushed by a falling tree. During extremely heavy rains, some low-lying parts of Tallahassee may flood, notably the Franklin Boulevard area adjacent to the downtown and the Killearn Lakes subdivision, outside the Tallahassee city limits, on the north side.

The most recent tornado to hit Tallahassee occurred on January 27, 2021. It was rated as EF0 tornado. The tornado caused damage to the city and the Tallahassee International Airport.

Demographics

2020 census

Note: the US Census treats Hispanic/Latino as an ethnic category. This table excludes Latinos from the racial categories and assigns them to a separate category. Hispanics/Latinos can be of any race.

2010 census
As of the 2010 census, the population of Tallahassee was 181,376. There were 75,949 households, 16.7% of which had children under 18 living in them. 27.7% were married couples living together(based on 2010 data), 14.4% had a female householder with no husband, and 53.7% were non-families. 34.1% of all households were made up of individuals living alone and 6.7% had someone living alone who was 65 years of age or older. The average household size was 2.23 and the average family size was 2.33. Children under the age of 5 were 4.9% of the population, persons under 18 were 16.7% and persons 65 years or older were 10.3%. The median age was 26 years. For every 100 females, there were 89.5 males. For every 100 females age 18 and over, there were 86.7 males.

56.2% of the population was White, 35.0% Black, 4.6% Asian, 0.2% American Indian and Alaska Native, 0.0% Native Hawaiian and Other Pacific Islander, 1.3% some other race, and 2.9% two or more races. 6.3% were Hispanic or Latino of any race, and 51.1% were non-Hispanic White. For 2009–2013, the estimated median household income was $39,524, and the per capita income was $23,778.

The percentage of persons below the poverty level was estimated at 30.2%.

Educationally, the population of Leon County is the most highly educated population in Florida with 54.4% of the residents over the age of 25 with a Bachelor's, Master's, professional or doctorate degree. The Florida average is 37.4% and the national average is 33.4%.

Languages
, 92.0% of residents spoke English as their first language, while 4.1% spoke Spanish, 0.6% spoke French, and 0.6% spoke German as their mother tongue. In total, 8.0% of the total population spoke languages other than English.

Law, government and politics

Politics
Tallahassee has traditionally been a Democratic city, but the party has been supported by different ethnic groups over time, with a major shift in the late 20th century. Leon County has voted Democratic in 24 of the past 29 presidential elections since 1904. But until the late 1960s, most African Americans were disenfranchised from the political system, dating from a new constitution and other laws passed by Democrats in Florida (and in all other Southern states) at the turn of the century. At that time, most African Americans were affiliated with the Republican Party, and their disenfranchisement resulted in that party being non-competitive in the region for decades. Subsequently, these demographic groups traded party alignments.

Since passage of the Voting Rights Act of 1965 and enforcement of constitutional rights for African Americans, voters in Tallahassee have elected black mayors and black state representatives. It has become a city in the Southern U.S. that is known for progressive activism. This is likely due to the large student population that attends Florida State University, Florida A&M University, and Tallahassee Community College. In addition, in the realignment of party politics since the late 20th century, most of the African-American population in the city now support Democratic Party candidates.

As of December 2, 2018, there were 112,572 Democrats, 58,083 Republicans, and 44,007 voters who were independent or had other affiliations among the 214,662 voters in Leon County.

Leon County's voter turnout percentage has consistently ranked among the highest of Florida's 67 counties, with a record-setting 86% turnout in the November 2008 general election. The county voted for Barack Obama in the presidential election.

Structure of city government
Tallahassee has a form of government with an elected mayor of Tallahassee, elected commissioners, and an at-will employed city manager, city departments, and staff.

The current city commissioners are:

Seat 1 – Jacqueline "Jack" Porter
Seat 2 – Curtis Richardson
Seat 3 – Jeremy Matlow
Seat 4 (Mayor) – John Dailey
Seat 5 – Dianne Williams-Cox

1826 Dr. Charles Haire
1827 David Ochiltree
1828–1829 John Y. Gary 
1830 Leslie A. Thompson
1831 Charles Austin 
1832–1833 Leslie A. Thompson
1834 Robert J. Hackley 
1835 William Wilson
1836 John Rea 
1837 William P. Gorman 
1838 William Hilliard 
1839 R. F. Ker 
1840 Leslie A. Thompson 
1841–1844 Francis W. Eppes 
1845 James A. Berthelot 
1846 Simon Towle
1847 James Kirksey
1848 F. H. Flagg
1849 Thomas J. Perkins
1850–1851 D. P. Hogue
1852 David S. Walker
1853 Richard Hayward
1854–1855 Thomas Hayward
1856–1857 Francis W. Eppes
1858–1860 D. P. Hogue
1861–1865 P. T. Pearce
1866 Francis W. Eppes 
1867–1868 D. P. Hogue 
1869–1870 T. P. Tatum
1871 C. E. Dyke
1872–1874 C. H. Edwards
1875 David S. Walker, Jr.
1876 Samuel Walker
1877 Jesse Bernard 
1878–1879 David S. Walker, Jr.
1880 Henry Bernreuter 
1881 Edward Lewis
1882 John W. Nash 
1883 Edward Lewis 
1884–1885 Charles C. Pearce 
1886 George W. Walker 
1887 A. J. Fish 
1888–1889 R. B. Forman 
1890–1894 R. B. Carpenter 
1895–1896 Jesse T. Bernard
1897 R. A. Shine
1898–1902 R. B. Gorman
1903–1904 William L. Moor
1905 John W. Henderson
1906 F. C. Gilmore
1907 W. M. McIntosh, Jr.
1908 F. C. Gilmore
1909 Francis B. Winthrop
1910–1917 D. M. Lowry
1918 J. R. McDaniel
1919–1921 Guyte P. McCord 
1922–1923 A. P. McCaskill 
1924–1925 B. A. Meginniss 
1926 W. Theo Proctor 
1927 B.A. Meginniss
1928–1929 W. Theo Proctor 
1930 G. E. Lewis 
1931 Frank D. Moor 
1932–1933 W. L. Marshall 
1934 J. L. Fain 
1935 Leonard A. Wesson 
1936 H. J. Yaeger 
1937 L. A. Wesson 
1938 J. R. Jinks 
1939 S. A. Wahnish
1940 F. C. Moor
1941 Charles S. Ausley
1942 Jack W. Simmons
1943 A. R. Richardson
1944 Charles S. Ausley
1945 Ralph E. Proctor
1946 Fred S. Winterle
1947 George I. Martin
1948 Fred N. Lowry
1949–1950 Robert C. Parker
1951 W. H. Cates 
1952 B. A. Ragsdale 
1953 William T. Mayo 
1954 H. G. Esterwood 
1954 H. C. Summitt
1955–1956 J. T. Williams
1956 Fred S. Winterle
1956–1957 John Y. Humphress
1957 J. W. Cordell
1958 Davis H. Atkinson
1959 Hugh E. Williams, Jr. 
1960 George S. Taft 
1961 J. W. Cordell 
1962 Davis H. Atkinson 
1963 S. E. Teague, Jr. 
1964 Hugh E. Williams, Jr. 
1965 George S. Taft 
1966 W. H. Cates 
1967 John A. Rudd, Sr. 
1968 Gene Berkowitz 
1969 Spurgeon Camp 
1970 Lee A. Everhart 
1971 Gene Berkowitz 
1972 James R. Ford
1973 Joan Heggen
1974–1975 John R. Jones
1976 James R. Ford
1977–1978 Neal D. Sapp
1979 Sheldon A. Hilaman
1980–1981 Hurley W. Rudd
1982 James R. Ford
1983 Carol Bellamy
1984 Kent Spriggs
1985 Hurley W. Rudd
1986 Jack McClean
1987–1988 Betty Harley
1988–1990 Dorothy Inman
1990 Steve Meisberg
1991–1992 Debbie Lightsey
1993–1994 Dorothy Inman-Crews
1994–1995 Penny Herman
1995–1996 Scott Maddox
1996–1997 Ron Weaver
1997–2003 Scott Maddox
2003–2014 John Marks
2014–2018 Andrew Gillum
2018–present John Dailey

Federal representation and offices

Tallahassee is split between Florida's 2nd congressional district and Florida's 5th congressional district.

The United States Postal Service operates post offices in Tallahassee. The Tallahassee Main Post Office is at 2800 South Adams Street. Other post offices in the city limits include Centerville Station, Leon Station, Park Avenue Station, and Westside Station.

The National Oceanic and Atmospheric Administration maintains a National Weather Service in Tallahassee. Their coverage-warning area includes the eastern Florida Panhandle and adjacent Gulf of Mexico waters, the north-central Florida peninsula, and parts of southeastern Alabama and southwestern Georgia.

The United States Army Reserve 81st Regional Support Command (USAR) opened an Army Reserve Center at 4307 Jackson Bluff Road.

The Naval and Marine Corps Reserve Center (NMCRC) is at 2910 Roberts Avenue host the United States Navy Reserve Navy Operational Support Center Tallahassee (NOSC Tallahassee) and the United States Marine Corps Reserve 2nd Platoon, Company E, Anti-Terrorism Battalion and 3rd Platoon, Company E, Anti-Terrorism Battalion.

Consolidation
Voters of Leon County have gone to the polls four times to vote on consolidation of Tallahassee and Leon County governments into one jurisdiction combining police and other city services with already shared (consolidated) Tallahassee Fire Department and Leon County Emergency Medical Services. Roughly 36 percent of Leon County's 265,714 residents live outside the Tallahassee city limits.

Each time, the measure was rejected:

The proponents of consolidation have stated the new jurisdiction would attract business by its size. Merging governments would cut government waste, duplication of services, etc. However, Professor Richard Feiock of the Department of Public Administration of Korea University and the Askew School of Public Administration and Policy of Florida State University states that no discernible relationship exists between consolidation and the local economy.

Flag
The former flag of Tallahassee was vaguely similar to the flag of Florida, a white saltire on a blue field, with the city's coat of arms, featuring the cupola of the old capitol building, at the center. The flag is an homage to the Scottish and Ulster-Scots Presbyterian heritage of the original founders of the city, most of whom were settlers from North Carolina whose ancestors had either come to America directly from Scotland, or were Presbyterians of Scottish descent from County Down and County Antrim in what has since become Northern Ireland. The current flag incorporates a stylized 5-point star and the city name on a white background.

Education

Primary and secondary

Tallahassee anchors the Leon County School District. As of the 2009 school year Leon County Schools had an estimated 32,796 students, 2209 teachers and 2100 administrative and support personnel. The superintendent of schools is Rocky Hanna. Leon County public school enrollment continues to grow steadily (up approximately 1% per year since the 1990–91 school year). The dropout rate for grades 9–12 improved to 2.2% in the 2007–2008 school year, the third time in the past four years the dropout rate has been below 3%.

To gauge performance the State of Florida rates all public schools according to student achievement on the state-sponsored Florida Comprehensive Assessment Test (FCAT). Seventy-nine percent of Leon County Public Schools received an A or B grade in the 2008–2009 school year. The overall district grade assigned to the Leon County Schools is "A". Students in the Leon County School District continued to score favorably in comparison to Florida and national averages in the SAT and ACT student assessment tests. The Leon County School District has consistently scored at or above the average for districts statewide in total ACT and SAT mean composite scores.

 Leon County high schools

 Public schools belonging to universities
 Florida State University School ("Florida High") (K–12)
 Florida A&M University Developmental Research School (K–12)

 Charter schools
 Governor's Charter Academy (GCA) (K–8) – Established in August 2012.
 School of Arts and Sciences (SAS) (K–8) – Established in 1999
 Tallahassee School of Math and Science (TSMS) (K–8) – It was previously known as Stars Middle School and only served middle school. In 2014 it received a new charter, adopted its current name, and expanded to elementary grades.

 Private schools

 Virtual schools
Franklin Virtual High School

Higher education

Florida State University

Florida State University (commonly referred to as Florida State or FSU) is an American public space-grant and sea-grant research university. Florida State is on a 1,391.54-acre (5.631 km2) campus in the state capital of Tallahassee, Florida, United States. It is a senior member of the State University System of Florida. Founded in 1851, it is on the oldest continuous site of higher education in the state of Florida.

The university is classified as a Research University with Very High Research by the Carnegie Foundation for the Advancement of Teaching. The university comprises 16 separate colleges and more than 110 centers, facilities, labs and institutes that offer more than 360 programs of study, including professional school programs. The university has an annual budget of over $1.7 billion. Florida State is home to Florida's only National Laboratory – the National High Magnetic Field Laboratory and is the birthplace of the commercially viable anti-cancer drug Taxol. Florida State University also operates The John & Mable Ringling Museum of Art, the State Art Museum of Florida and one of the nation's largest museum/university complexes.

The university is accredited by the Southern Association of Colleges and Schools (SACS). Florida State University is home to nationally ranked programs in many academic areas, including law, business, engineering, medicine, social policy, film, music, theater, dance, visual art, political science, psychology, social work, and the sciences. Florida State University leads Florida in four of eight areas of external funding for the STEM disciplines (Science, Technology, Engineering and Math).

For 2022, U.S. News & World Report ranked Florida State as the 19th best public university in the United States and 55th among top national universities.

Florida Governor Rick Scott and the state legislature designated Florida State University as one of two "preeminent" state universities in the spring of 2013 among the twelve universities of the State University System of Florida.

FSU's intercollegiate sports teams, commonly known by their Florida State Seminoles nickname, compete in National Collegiate Athletic Association (NCAA) Division I and the Atlantic Coast Conference (ACC). The Florida State Seminoles athletics program are favorites of passionate students, fans and alumni across the United States, especially when led by the Marching Chiefs of the Florida State University College of Music. In their 113-year history, Florida State's varsity sports teams have won 20 national athletic championships and Seminole athletes have won 78 individual NCAA national championships.

Florida A&M University

Founded on October 3, 1887, Florida A&M University (commonly referred to as FAMU) is a public, historically black university and land-grant university that is part of the State University System of Florida and is accredited by the Southern Association of Colleges and Schools. The university also has several satellite campuses, including a site in Orlando where its College of Law is located and sites in Miami, Jacksonville and Tampa for its pharmacy program. Florida A&M University offers 54 bachelor's degrees and 29 master's degrees. The university has 12 schools and colleges and one institute.

FAMU has 11 doctoral programs which include 10 PhD programs: chemical engineering, civil engineering, electrical engineering, mechanical engineering, industrial engineering, biomedical engineering, physics, pharmaceutical sciences, educational leadership, and environmental sciences. Top undergraduate programs are architecture, journalism, computer information sciences, and psychology. FAMU's top graduate programs include pharmaceutical sciences along with public health, physical therapy, engineering, physics, master's of applied social sciences (especially history and public administration), business and sociology.

Tallahassee Community College

Tallahassee Community College (TCC) is a member of the Florida College System. Tallahassee Community College is accredited by the Florida Department of Education and the Southern Association of Colleges and Schools. Its primary campus is on a 270-acre (1.092 km2) campus in Tallahassee. The institution was founded in 1966 by the Florida Legislature.

TCC offers Bachelor's of Science, Associate of Arts, Associate of Science, and Associate of Applied Sciences degrees. In 2013, Tallahassee Community College was listed 1st in the nation in graduating students with A.A. degrees. TCC is also the No. 1 transfer school in the nation to Florida State University and Florida A&M University. As of Fall 2015, TCC reported 38,017 students.

In partnership with Florida State University, and Florida A&M University Tallahassee Community College offers the TCC2FSU, and TCC2FAMU program. This program provides guaranteed admission into Florida State University and Florida A&M University for TCC Associate in Arts degree graduates.

List of other colleges

 Barry University School of Adult and Continuing Education – Tallahassee Campus
 Embry-Riddle Aeronautical University
 Flagler College – Tallahassee Campus
 Keiser University – Tallahassee Campus
 Lewis M. Lively Area Vocational-Technical School
 Saint Leo University – Tallahassee Campus

Economy

Companies based in Tallahassee include: Citizens Property Insurance Corporation, the Municipal Code Corporation, the State Board of Administration of Florida (SBA), the Mainline Information Systems, and United Solutions Company.

Top employers
According to Tallahassee's 2021 Annual Comprehensive Financial Report, the top employers in the city are:

Arts and culture

Entertainment and performing arts
Tallahassee is home to many entertainment venues, theaters, museums, parks and performing arts centers.

A major source of entertainment and art is the Railroad Square Art Park. The Railroad Square Art Park is an arts, culture and entertainment district of Tallahassee, Florida, off Railroad Avenue, filled with a variety of metal art sculptures and stores selling artwork and collectibles. Railroad Square is mainly known for its small locally owned shops and working artist studios, and its alternative art scene. On the first Friday of every month, Railroad Square is home to a free gallery hop known as First Friday from 6pm-9pm, where upwards of 5000-7000+ Tallahasseeans of all ages come to experience art.

Museums
Tallahassee is known for its many museums. It is home to the Museum of Fine Arts at Florida State University, Tallahassee Museum, Goodward Museum & Gardens, Museum of Florida History, Mission San Luis de Apalachee, Tallahassee Automobile Museum, Old Capitol Museum, Knott House Museum, and The Grove.

Festivals and events

Downtown Getdown (Florida State Seminoles Pep Rally)
First Friday festivals at Railroad Square
Greek Food Festival
Springtime Tallahassee
Tallahassee Wine and Food Festival
Winter Festival

City accolades

1988: Money Magazines Southeast's three top medium size cities in which to live.
1992: Awarded Tree City USA by National Arbor Day Foundation
1999: Awarded All-America City Award by the National Civic League
2003: Awarded Tree Line USA by the National Arbor Day Foundation.
2006: Awarded "Best In America" Parks and Recreation by the National Recreation and Park Association.
2007: Recognized by Kiplinger's Personal Finance Magazine as one of the "Top Ten College Towns for Grownups" (ranking second, behind Chapel Hill, North Carolina)
2007: Ranked second in the "medium sized city" class on Epodunk's list of college towns.
2015: Awarded All-America City Award by the National Civic League

Sports

Florida State Seminoles
Tallahassee is home to one of the most competitive collegiate athletics programs in the nation, the Florida State Seminoles of Florida State University. The Seminoles compete in the Atlantic Coast Conference of the National Collegiate Athletic Association. The university funds 20 varsity teams, consisting of 9 male and 11 female. They have collectively won 19 team national championships, and over 100 team conference championships, as well as numerous individual national and conference titles. The program has placed in the top-10 final standings of the Director's Cup four times since 2008–2009, including No. 4 for the 2009–2010 season and No. 4 for the 2011–2012 season. In 2016–2017, the program generated the thirteenth-most revenue in collegiate athletics with $144,514,413 of total revenue.

College football game weekends bring in a significant amount of tourism to Leon County. FSU home games had a total attendance of 575,478 people with an average of 82,211 attendees per game in 2014. During football season, out-of-town attendees brought $48.8 million in direct spending during the six home games. In 2016, Florida State football home games resulted in $95.5 million of economic impact on Leon County.

Other

Tallahassee is home to Tallahassee SC, a soccer club that was founded in 2018 and plays in the National Premier Soccer League.

Some former sports clubs in Tallahassee include the Tallahassee Tiger Sharks, Tallahassee Scorpions, Tallahassee Thunder, Tallahassee Titans, and the Tallahassee Tigers.

Media

Print
The Tallahassee Democrat, Tallahassee's largest newspaper, published daily
The FSView & Florida Flambeau, covers Florida State University
The Talon, covers Tallahassee Community College
The Famuan, covers Florida A&M University

Television

WCTV (CBS) channel 6.1 (MeTV) channel 6.2 (Circle) channel 6.3 (ION) channel 6.4 (Justice) channel 6.5 (MyTV) channel 6.6 (This TV) channel 6.7
WFSU (PBS) channel 11.1 (Florida Channel) channel 11.2 (Create) channel 11.3 (Kids 360) channel 11.4 
WTLF (CW) channel 24.1 (Comet) channel 24.2 (TBD) channel 24.3 (Dabl) channel 24.4
WTLH (H&I) channel 49.1 (CW) channel 49.2 (Comet) channel 49.3
WTWC (NBC) channel 40.1 (Fox) channel 40.2 (Charge) channel 40.3
WTXL (ABC) channel 27.1 (Bounce) channel 27.2 (Grit) channel 27.3 (Escape) channel 27.4 (CourtTV) channel 27.5 (Newsy) channel 27.6 (HSN) channel 27.7
WNXG-LD (WCTV simulcast channels 6.1 - 6.6 ATSC 3.0)
WVUP (CTN) channel 45.1 (LifeStyle) channel 45.2
WTFL-LD (MyNetwork TV) channel 15.1 (Decades) channel 15.2 (Start TV) channel 15.3 (Telemundo) channel 15.4

Radio

WANM, Soul/R&B music
WAYT-FM, contemporary Christian music
WBZE-FM, adult contemporary music
WDXD-LP, classic country music
WFLA-FM, news/talk
WFSQ-FM, classical music
WFSU-FM, news/talk
WGLF-FM, classic rock music
WGMY-FM, Top 40 music
WHTF-FM, Top 40 music
WTLY, adult contemporary music
WTNT-FM, country music
WVFS-FM, college/alternative music
WVFT, news/talk
WWLD, hip-hop music
WWOF-FM, country music
WXSR-FM, rock music

Public safety

Established in 1826, the Tallahassee Police Department once claimed to be the oldest police department in the Southern United States, and the second-oldest in the U.S., preceded only by the Philadelphia Police Department (established in 1758). The Boston Police Department was established in 1838 and larger East Coast cities followed with New York City and Baltimore in 1845. However, this is proven incorrect. Pensacola, Florida, for example, had a municipal police force as early as 1821.

There are over 800 sworn law enforcement officers in Tallahassee. Law enforcement services are provided by the Tallahassee Police Department, the Leon County Sheriff's Office, the Florida Department of Law Enforcement, Florida Capitol Police, Florida State University Police Department, Florida A&M University Police Department, the Tallahassee Community College Police Department, the Florida Highway Patrol, and the Florida Fish and Wildlife Conservation Commission.

The Tallahassee Growth Management Building Inspection Division is responsible for issuing permits and performing inspections of public and private buildings in the city limits. These duties include the enforcement of the Florida Building Codes and the Florida Fire Protection Codes. These standards are present to protect life and property. The Tallahassee Building Department is one of 13 Accredited Building Departments in the United States.

The Federal Bureau of Investigation, United States Marshals Service, Immigration and Customs Enforcement, Bureau of Alcohol, Tobacco, Firearms and Explosives, Secret Service and Drug Enforcement Administration have offices in Tallahassee. The United States District Court for the Northern District of Florida is based in Tallahassee.

Fire and rescue services are provided by the Tallahassee Fire Department and Leon County Emergency Medical Services.

Hospitals in the area include Tallahassee Memorial Healthcare, Capital Regional Medical Center and HealthSouth Rehabilitation Hospital of Tallahassee.

Places of interest

Alfred B. Maclay Gardens State Park
Carnegie Library at FAMU
Challenger Learning Center
Co-Cathedral of St. Thomas More
Doak Campbell Stadium
Elinor Klapp-Phipps Park
First Presbyterian Church
Florida Governor's Mansion
Florida State Capitol
Florida Supreme Court
Foster Tanner Fine Arts Gallery at Florida A&M University
Goodwood Museum and Gardens
Innovation Park
John G. Riley Center/Museum of African American History & Culture (Riley Museum)
Knott House Museum
Lake Ella
Lake Jackson Mounds Archaeological State Park
LeRoy Collins Leon County Public Library
Mission San Luis de Apalachee
Museum of Florida History
National High Magnetic Field Laboratory
Railroad Square
Southeastern Regional Black Archives Research Center and Museum
St. John's Episcopal Church
Tallahassee Automobile Museum
Tallahassee Museum
James D. Westcott Building and Ruby Diamond Auditorium at Florida State University

Transportation

Aviation
Tallahassee International Airport (KTLH)

Defunct airports
Dale Mabry Field (closed 1961)
Tallahassee Commercial Airport (closed 2011)

Mass transit
StarMetro provides bus service throughout the city.

Intercity bus
Greyhound and Megabus based in downtown Tallahassee.

Railroads
Freight service is provided by the Florida Gulf & Atlantic Railroad, which acquired most of the CSX main line from Pensacola to Jacksonville on June 1, 2019.  FG&A also purchased the CSX branch from Tallahassee to Attapulgus, Georgia, connecting with the CSX Montgomery-Savannah main line at Bainbridge, Georgia.  FG&A's headquarters office is in Tallahassee.

Defunct railroads and passenger trains
Tallahassee Railroad, completed in 1837, now the state-owned Tallahassee-St. Marks Historic Railroad State Trail from Tallahassee southward to St. Marks, about 20 miles.
Carrabelle, Tallahassee and Georgia Railroad, founded in 1891, merged into the Georgia Florida and Alabama Railway in 1906.  The Tallahassee-Carrabelle segment was abandoned in 1948. In 2009, a 2.4-mile segment of the abandoned railroad was opened as the Tallahassee-Georgia Florida and Alabama (GF&A) Trail in the Apalachicola National Forest.
The streamlined Gulf Wind coach and Pullman passenger train, operated jointly by the L&N and Seaboard railroads, served Tallahassee from 1949 to 1971, when the newly formed Amtrak cancelled the train.
Amtrak's Sunset Limited served Tallahassee from April 1993 until service east of New Orleans was suspended in August 2005, following Hurricane Katrina, which caused extensive damage to CSX lines from Louisiana to Florida. The service has never been reinstated, and as of mid-2019 had a "next to zero chance" of being revived by Amtrak. In 2021, Amtrak announced plans restore service as early as 2022 along part of the route from New Orleans to Alabama, but not into Florida. The Tallahassee and Pensacola metropolitan areas are the largest in the state without passenger rail service.

Major highways
 Interstate 10 runs east and west across the north side of the city. Tallahassee is served by five exits including: Exit 192 (U.S. 90), Exit 196 (Capital Circle NW), Exit 199 (U.S. 27/Monroe St.), Exit 203 (U.S. 319/Thomasville Road and Capital Circle NE), and Exit 209 (U.S. 90/Mahan Dr.)
 U.S. Route 27 enters the city from the northwest before turning south and entering downtown. This portion of U.S. 27 is known locally as Monroe Street. In front of the historic state capitol building, U.S. 27 turns east and follows Apalachee Parkway out of the city.
 U.S. Route 90 runs east and west through Tallahassee. It is known locally as Tennessee Street west of Magnolia Drive and Mahan Drive east of Magnolia.
 U.S. Route 319 runs north and south along the east side of the city using Thomasville Road, Capital Circle NE, Capital Circle SE, and Crawfordville Road.
 State Road 20
 State Road 61
 State Road 363
Orchard Pond Parkway, the first privately-built toll road in Florida.

Namesakes
CSS Tallahassee, 1864 Confederate cruiser
, 1908 US Navy monitor, originally named USS Florida
, 1941 US Navy light cruiser, converted to the aircraft carrier USS Princeton
, 1944 US Navy light cruiser
Tallahassee, main character in the movie Zombieland
Tallahassee, album recorded by The Mountain Goats
Tallahassee Community School, Eastern Passage, Nova Scotia, named after CSS Tallahassee
Tallahassee Tight, early-20th century blues singer
T-Pain, musician, originally "Tallahassee Pain"
"Tallahassee Lassie", Freddy Cannon song

Sister cities

Tallahassee has 6 sister cities as follows:

 Konongo-Odumase, Ashanti, Ghana
 Krasnodar, Krasnodar Krai, Russia
 St. Maarten, Netherlands Antilles
 Sligo, County Sligo, Ireland
 Rugao, Jiangsu, China
 Ramat HaSharon, Tel Aviv District, Israel

Notable people
This is a list of notable people from Tallahassee, in alphabetical order by last name:

Cannonball Adderley, musician
Wally Amos (born 1936), television personality and founder of Famous Amos Cookies
Mark Boswell (born 1960), film director
Bobby Bowden, Florida State University football coach
Ethel Cain (born 1998), singer-songwriter
LeRoy Collins, Florida governor
Paul Dirac, theoretical physicist and Nobel Laureate
Nikki Fried (born 1977), Florida commissioner of agriculture 
Julian Green, soccer player
Carla Hayden, 14th Librarian of Congress
Robert A. Holton, chemist and inventor of Taxol
Missy Hyatt (born 1963), professional wrestling valet, commentator, and professional wrestler
Kent Jones (born 1993), rapper
Sir Harold Kroto, Nobel Prize-winning scientist
Payne Midyette (1898–1983), insurance broker, Tallahassee politician and rancher
Jim Morrison, singer, poet, and songwriter
T-Pain (born 1984), rapper turned singer
Mary L. Proctor (born 1960), folk artist
W. Stanley "Sandy" Proctor, sculptor
KJ Smith, model, actress
Gregory Tony (born 1978), Sheriff of Broward County, Florida
Yvonne Edwards Tucker (born 1941), potter
Ann VanderMeer, Hugo Award-winning editor
Jeff VanderMeer, New York Times Bestselling author
Florence Duval West (1840–1881), poet

Tallahassee groups and organizations

Cold Water Army, music group
Creed, rock band
Cream Abdul Babar, music group
The Crüxshadows, music group
David Canter, medical doctor, folk musician
Dead Prez, Alternative hip hop duo
Go Radio, music group
FAMU Marching 100, marching band
FSU Marching Chiefs, marching band
Look Mexico, rock band
Mayday Parade, music group
Mira, music group
No Address, music group
Socialburn, rock band
Tallahassee Symphony Orchestra, symphony orchestra
Woman's Club of Tallahassee

State associations based in Tallahassee

The Florida Bar
Florida Chamber of Commerce
Florida Dental Association
Florida Institute of CPAs
Florida Lottery
Independent Colleges and Universities of Florida

Gallery

See also

Consolidation of Leon County with Tallahassee
History of Tallahassee, Florida
Park Avenue Historic District
Tallahassee Historic District Zones I And II
USS Tallahassee, 3 ships

References

Further reading

Hare, Julianne. Tallahassee: a capital city history. Arcadia Publishing. 2002
Tebeau, Charlton, W. A History of Florida. University of Miami Press. Coral Gables. 1971
Williams, John Lee. Journal of an Expedition to the Interior of West Florida October–November 1823. Manuscript on file at the State Library of Florida, Florida Collection. Tallahassee.

External links

The Local Conservation District – Information on Natural Resources, and Panoramic Tours
The Tallahassee Democrat Newspaper
Mission San Luis
Tallahassee Trust for Historic Preservation – Places to Discover
Ochlockonee River – St. Marks River Watersheds – Florida DEP

 
Cities in Florida
Cities in Leon County, Florida
Populated places established in 1821
Tallahassee metropolitan area
County seats in Florida
1824 establishments in Florida Territory